The Battle at Borodino Field was a part of the Battle of Moscow, on the Eastern Front of World War II. While referring to the battle in Russian, the Borodino Field is actually more commonly applied rather than just Borodino, cf. Georgy Zhukov ("...this division [32nd] was forced to cross the arms with the enemy on the Borodino Field...").

At noon on 13 October 1941, German Junkers and Messerschmitt aircraft appeared over the Borodino Field, site of the climactic 1812 French-Russian clash. On 16 October, severe fighting broke out in the center of Borodino Field. Subsequently, the Germans managed to take the field. The Spaso-Borodinsky Monastery was burnt and the Borodino Museum suffered damage. Borodino Field was freed by the 82nd Soviet Rifle Division during the Russian counter offensive.

Reportedly, Col. Victor Polosukhin of the Red Army, whose unit was on Borodino Field, looked in on the museum shortly before it was damaged.  He signed the visitors' guestbook and under "Purpose of Visit" wrote "I have come to defend the battlefield."

See also
 Battle of Moscow (film)

Notes

Sources
За нами Москва. Бородино. 1941. Воспоминания. М., 2007 (memoirs and letter extracts of Soviet 5th Army soldiers)

External links
Hitler's Borodino (Time.com)

Conflicts in 1941
1941 in the Soviet Union
Battles and operations of the Soviet–German War
Battles of World War II involving Germany
Battles involving the Soviet Union
October 1941 events
November 1941 events
December 1941 events
January 1942 events